Jacob's Well, also known as Jacob's fountain and Well of Sychar, is a deep well constructed into the bedrock that has been associated in religious tradition with Jacob for roughly two millennia. It is situated inside an Eastern Orthodox church and monastery, in Balata village on the outskirts of the Palestinian city of Nablus in the West Bank.

Religious significance
Bromiley (1982) claims that Jewish, Samaritan, Christian, and Muslim traditions associate the well with Jacob, but only mentions examples of Christian pilgrimage and Western research. Samaritan and Christian interest in the site is supported by Gurevich & Harani (2017), who refute any Jewish interest in it. There is no reference yet in this article apart from Bromiley in favour of Muslims associating the well with Yakub.

Judaism
According to Gurevich & Harani (2017), "Judaism does not attribute any significance to the site", citing Yitzhak Magen (2009), Flavia Neapolis: Shechem in the Roman Period, vol. 1, p. 32. This contradicts Bromiley (1982), who states that "Although the OT does not refer to it, Jewish, Samaritan, Moslem, and Christian traditions associate this well with the patriarch Jacob." No well of Jacob is specifically mentioned in the Hebrew Bible (the base of the Old Testament);  only states that when Jacob returned to Shechem from Paddan Aram, he camped "before" the city and bought the land on which he pitched his tent and erected an altar.

Samaritanism
Gurevich & Harani write that "[t]he Samaritans believe that the well was purchased by Jacob the Patriarch."

Christianity
The present-day church containing the well has been built close to the archaeological site of Tell Balata, which is thought to be the site of biblical Shechem. Some Biblical scholars contend that the plot of land is the same one upon which Jacob's Well was constructed. Other Biblical scholars have made note of the well discovered in the "open country" of the "land of the Kedemites" in Genesis 29 where Jacob meets his future bride, Rachel.

Jacob's Well is mentioned by name once in the New Testament in a passage which says that Jesus "came to a city of Samaria called Sychar, near the field which Jacob gave to his son Joseph. Jacob's well was there." John's Gospel goes on to describe a conversation between Jesus and a Samaritan woman (called Photini in Orthodox tradition), which took place while Jesus was resting at the well after a tiring journey. The site is counted as a Christian holy site. From a Christian perspective, the reference in John's Gospel to the well seems to hint at a deeper nuptial reading of Jesus as the Bridegroom of Israel come to reunite the divided tribes through a spiritual union with him, the long-awaited Messiah; see St. Augustine's Tractate 15 on the Gospel of John.

History
The writings of pilgrims indicate that Jacob's Well has been situated within different churches built at the same site over time. By the 330s CE, the site had been identified as the place where Jesus held his conversation with the Samaritan woman, and was probably being used for Christian baptisms. By 384 CE, a cruciform church was built over the site, and is mentioned in the 4th century writings of Saint Jerome. This church was most likely destroyed during the Samaritan revolts of 484 or 529 CE. Subsequently, rebuilt by Justinian, this second Byzantine era church was still standing in the 720s CE, and possibly into the early 9th century CE.

The Byzantine church was definitely in ruins by the time the Crusaders occupied Nablus in August 1099 CE; early 12th-century accounts by pilgrims to the site speak of the well without mentioning a church. These include the appointment of Sir Henry Maleverer as guardian of the well under the King of Jerusalem. There are later 12th-century accounts of a newly built church at Jacob's Well. The first such definitive account comes from Theoderic, who writes: "The well ... is a half a mile distant from the city Nablus: it lies in front of the altar in the church built over it, in which nuns devote themselves to the service of God. This well is called the Fountain of Jacob." This Crusader era church was constructed in 1175, likely due to the support of Queen Melisande, who was exiled to Nablus in 1152 where she lived until her death in 1161. This church appears to have been destroyed following Saladin's victory over the Crusaders in the Battle of Hittin in 1187.

Edward Robinson visited the site in the mid-19th century, describing the "remains of the ancient church," lying just above the well to the southwest as a "shapeless mass of ruins, among which are seen fragments of gray, granite columns, still retaining their ancient polish." Local Christians continued to venerate the site even when it was without a church. In 1860, the site was obtained by the Greek Orthodox Patriarchate and a new church, consecrated to St. Photini the Samaritan, was built in 1893 along with a small monastery. The 1927 Jericho earthquake destroyed that building.

In November 1979, at a time of increased tensions on the West Bank, the custodian of the well, Archimandrite Philoumenos, was found hatcheted to death inside the crypt housing the well. The assailant, a mentally ill resident of Tel Aviv, was apprehended three years later and confessed to that slaying and others, including an assault on a nun at the monastery and the axe murder of a Jewish psychiatrist in Tel Aviv. In 2009, the Greek Orthodox Patriarchate of Jerusalem declared Philoumenos a saint thirty years after his death.

Abuna (meaning "Father") Ioustinos, a Greek Orthodox priest from Nablus, later spearheaded a huge reconstruction project. Jacob's Well has since been restored and a new church modelled along the designs of the Crusader-era church houses the well inside it, in a crypt on a lower level.

Physical description and location
The well is accessed by entering the church on the monastery grounds, and descending the stairs to a crypt where the well still stands, along with "a small winch, a bucket, ex-voto icons and lots of lit candles."

According to Major Anderson, who visited the site in 1866, the well has: "...a narrow opening, just wide enough to allow the body of a man to pass through with arms uplifted, and this narrow neck, which is about 4 ft. long, opens into the well itself, which is cylindrically shaped, and opens about 7 ft. 6 in. in diameter. The well and upper part of the well are built of masonry, and the well appears to have been sunk through a mixture of alluvial soil and limestone fragments, till a compact bed of mountain limestone was reached, having horizontal strata which could be easily worked; and the interior of the well presents the appearance of having been lined throughout with rough masonry."

See also
Bir Ma'in, Arab village near Ramle, connected by a foundation legend to Jacob/Ya'kub and Daughters of Jacob Bridge/Jisr Benat Ya'kub.
Daughters of Jacob Bridge on the Jordan, associated with biblical Jacob due to a misunderstanding
Jubb Yussef (Joseph's Well), site associated with biblical Joseph in Muslim tradition
Levantine archaeology
Philoumenos (Hasapis) of Jacob's Well

References

Bibliography

Maundrell, H. (1836). A Journey from Aleppo to Jerusalem: At Easter, A.D. 1697 : to which is Added an Account of the Author's Journey to the Banks of the Euphrates at Beer, and to the Country of Mesopotamia. 271 pages.

External links

 
 

Religion in Palestine (region)
Jacob
Churches in the West Bank
Buildings and structures in Nablus
Water wells
Tourist attractions in the State of Palestine
Church buildings in the Kingdom of Jerusalem
State of Palestine in the Roman era
The original story of the discovery of the well, by Jacob, and of his meeting Rachel. Specifically, verses 2,3,10,11 of Chapter 29 of Genesis.